Microtachycines is a genus of cave or camel crickets in the subfamily Aemodogryllinae and tribe Aemodogryllini.  The type species name M. tamdaonensis is based on specimens found in Tam Dao National Park in Vietnam.

Species
The Orthoptera Species File lists:
 Microtachycines elongatus Qin, Liu & Li, 2017
 Microtachycines fallax Qin, Liu & Li, 2017
 Microtachycines tamdaonensis Gorochov, 1992 - type species, locality Tam Đảo, Vietnam

References 

Ensifera genera
Rhaphidophoridae
Orthoptera of Indo-China